Mark Darrell Jerue (born January 15, 1960) is a former professional American football linebacker in the National Football League (NFL). He played seven seasons for the Los Angeles Rams (1983–1989).

See also
 Washington Huskies football statistical leaders

References 

1960 births
Living people
Players of American football from Seattle
American football linebackers
Washington Huskies football players
Los Angeles Rams players
Ed Block Courage Award recipients